Topolyovka is a rural locality (a village) in Gorod Vyazniki, Vyaznikovsky District, Vladimir Oblast, Russia. The population was 4 as of 2010.

Geography 
Topolyovka is located 18 km southeast of Vyazniki (the district's administrative centre) by road. Mishurovo is the nearest rural locality.

References 

Rural localities in Vyaznikovsky District